Nellie M.  Gorbea (born July 12, 1967) is an American politician. A member of the Democratic Party, she had served as the Secretary of State of Rhode Island from 2015 to 2023. Gorbea became the first Hispanic to win statewide office in New England.

Early life and education
Gorbea was born and raised in Puerto Rico. She earned a bachelor's degree from Princeton University's School of International and Public Affairs and a master's degree in public administration from Columbia University's School of International and Public Affairs. She moved to Rhode Island in the mid-1990s.

Career
Gorbea was Deputy Secretary of State under Secretary of State Matt Brown from 2002 through 2006. She worked for Fleet Securities, was the program officer for economic and community development for the Rhode Island Foundation, and founded the Rhode Island Latino Civic Fund. Before resigning in July 2013 to run for election as Secretary of State, she was executive director of Housing Works Rhode Island for five and a half years.

Incumbent Secretary of State Ralph Mollis was ineligible to run for reelection in the 2014 elections because of term limits. Gorbea campaigned for the position on a platform of making elections fair, fast and accurate, ensuring that Rhode Island businesses can easily start and thrive, bringing transparency to government, and increasing civic engagement. She defeated Guillaume de Ramel in the Democratic primary and Republican nominee John Carlevale in the general election. She was sworn in as Secretary of State on January 6, 2015, becoming the first Hispanic to hold statewide office in New England.

In 2016, Gorbea ushered in legislation to allow for stiffer penalties for violations of lobbying rules. 

In 2017, Gorbea worked to pass automatic voter registration; the bill, which automatically registers Rhode Islanders when they interact with the state Department of Motor Vehicles, was signed into law by Governor Gina Raimondo, making Rhode Island the ninth state in the United States to do so.

In November 2018, Gorbea was re-elected to a second term with over 67% of the vote.

In 2018, Gorbea worked to modernize Rhode Island's notary public laws to allow for electronic notarizations for the first time in Rhode Island.

On May 24, 2021, Gorbea announced she was running for the Democratic nomination for governor of Rhode Island in the 2022 election. She lost the Democratic Party primary election to the incumbent, Dan McKee.

Personal life
Gorbea lives in North Kingstown. She and her husband, Steven D'Hondt, have three daughters.

Electoral history

References

External links

Government website
Campaign website

1967 births
21st-century American politicians
21st-century American women politicians
American politicians of Puerto Rican descent
Hispanic and Latino American politicians
Living people
People from North Kingstown, Rhode Island
People from San Juan, Puerto Rico
Place of birth missing (living people)
Princeton School of Public and International Affairs alumni
Puerto Rican women in politics
Rhode Island Democrats
School of International and Public Affairs, Columbia University alumni
Secretaries of State of Rhode Island
Women in Rhode Island politics